Snell Hollow is a valley in Ste. Genevieve County in the U.S. state of Missouri.

Snell Hollow has the name of the Snell family of settlers.

References

Valleys of Ste. Genevieve County, Missouri
Valleys of Missouri